Wanstead and Woodford was a constituency in North East London represented in the House of Commons of the Parliament of the United Kingdom. It elected one Member of Parliament (MP) by the first past the post system of election. It existed between 1964 and 1997.

History of results

Between 51.7% and 63.6% of voters voted Conservative at the relevant elections (General Elections; there were no by-elections).

The runner-up's party varied, between Liberal and Labour candidates, and the winning majority ranged from 26.7% to 43% over the runner-up.

Boundaries
1964–1974: The Municipal Borough of Wanstead and Woodford (in Essex); (thus, 1965 to 1974, the same zone, in the London Borough of Redbridge as to local government unit (council) instead).

1974–1983: The London Borough of Redbridge wards of Bridge, Clayhall, Snaresbrook, Wanstead, and Woodford.

1983–1997: The London Borough of Redbridge wards of Bridge, Church End, Clayhall, Monkhams, Roding, Snaresbrook, and Wanstead.

Creation and successors
This seat was set out contingently by the Parliamentary Constituencies (Ilford and Woodford) Order 1960 from the calling of the next general election, which proved to be 1964. The Order adjusted the boundaries of Ilford North, Ilford South and Woodford (renamed Wanstead and Woodford), reflecting those of the boroughs in 1956.

This was the only boundary change (of any constituencies) between 1955 and February 1974.)

The seat until 1973 was almost identical to its forerunner Woodford (that is, had very minor boundary changes).

The seat was ended in 1997 so as to variously: 
contribute to (new seats)
Chingford and Woodford Green (Church End and Monkhams wards); and
Leyton and Wanstead (Snaresbrook and Wanstead wards), and 
enlarge Ilford North (Bridge, Clayhall and Roding wards).

Proposals to resurrect the seat existed in the Boundary Commission review published on 13 September 2011. If agreed, this would consist of wards Monkhams, Bridge, Church End, Roding, Snaresbrook and Wanstead with the return of Clayhall and the addition of Cranbrook and Valentines in Redbridge to the east of the A406 trunk road.

Members of Parliament

Elections

Elections in the 1960s

Elections in the 1970s

Elections in the 1980s

Elections in the 1990s

See also 
List of parliamentary constituencies in London

Notes and references 

Parliamentary constituencies in London (historic)
Constituencies of the Parliament of the United Kingdom established in 1964
Constituencies of the Parliament of the United Kingdom disestablished in 1997